Karsten Johannesen (17 January 1920 – 2 February 1997) was a Norwegian footballer. He played in one match for the Norway national football team in 1947.

References

External links
 

1920 births
1997 deaths
Norwegian footballers
Norway international footballers
Place of birth missing
Association footballers not categorized by position